Bourbon Street Beat is a private detective television series that aired on the ABC network from October 5, 1959, to July 4, 1960, starring Richard Long as Rex Randolph and Andrew Duggan as Cal Calhoun, with Arlene Howell as detective agency secretary Melody Lee Mercer and Van Williams as Kenny Madison.

Randolph and Calhoun — Special Services was based in the Absinthe House, a French Quarter nightclub on the title street. The firm's telephone number was EXpress 7123. The show's theme, "Bourbon Street Beat", was composed by Mack David and Jerry Livingston.

Characters
The series was one of several Warner Bros. detective shows which aired on ABC during this era, but Bourbon Street Beat was not as successful as the others.  When the series ended, the character of Rex Randolph moved to 77 Sunset Strip for a year, joining the L.A.-based detective firm of Bailey & Spencer for the 1960-61 season.  The character of Kenny Madison moved to the spin-off Surfside 6, which aired in the Bourbon Street Beat time slot the following season.  Set in Miami, this show lasted through mid-1962. Andrew Duggan's character, Cal Calhoun, was later seen on a 1962 episode of 77 Sunset Strip; it was established that he quit the P.I. business and returned to being a member of the New Orleans police force.

Legacy
Arlene Howell had appeared several times on 1957's western series Maverick, sometimes as a semi-regular character "Cindy Lou Brown," and was a former Miss USA; she appears to have retired from the screen after a last appearance as an understandably astonished Sergeant Carter's blind date on Gomer Pyle, U.S.M.C.. Richard Long went on to play the lead in the western series The Big Valley (1965–69) and the sitcom Nanny and the Professor (1970–71). Van Williams eventually played The Green Hornet (1966–67) opposite Bruce Lee. Andrew Duggan continued to portray a large number of character roles in films and television, including two other stints as series lead, taking over Cary Grant's movie role in the short-lived television version of Room for One More (1962), and as the sullen patriarch in Lancer (1968–70), a western in the vein of Bonanza, albeit darker and more complex.

Cast
Richard Long as Rex Randolph 
Andrew Duggan as Cal Calhoun
Arlene Howell as Melody Lee Mercer
Van Williams as Kenny Madison
Eddie Cole as The Baron (twelve episodes)
Tommy Farrell as Jay O'Hanlon (seven episodes)
Nita Talbot as Lusti Weather (four episodes)

Guest stars
The following are among the many guest stars on the single season of Bourbon Street Beat: 

Charles Aidman
Roscoe Ates
Tol Avery
Raymond Bailey
Don "Red" Barry
Jeanne Bates
Roxane Berard
Whit Bissell
Lane Bradford
Henry Brandon
Victor Buono
Walter Burke
Jean Byron
James T. Callahan
Richard Chamberlain
James Coburn
Robert Colbert
Tris Coffin
Gary Conway
Russ Conway
Kathleen Crowley
Michael Dante
Ray Danton
Richard Deacon
Cyril Delevanti
Brad Dexter
Ann Doran
James Drury
Bill Erwin
James Flavin
Kathleen Freeman
Lisa Gaye
Virginia Gregg
Myron Healey
John Hoyt
Brad Johnson
Shirley Knight
Ted Knight
Gail Kobe
Sandy Koufax
Nancy Kulp
Sue Anne Langdon
Suzanne Lloyd
John Marley
Diane McBain
Patrick McVey
Tyler McVey
Joanna Moore
Mary Tyler Moore
Rita Moreno
Jeanette Nolan
Jay Novello
Cynthia Pepper
Paul Picerni
Mala Powers
Judson Pratt
Denver Pyle
Rex Reason
Rhodes Reason
Madlyn Rhue
Carlos Romero
Richard Rust
Karen Steele
Randy Stuart
Vaughn Taylor
Mary Treen
Lurene Tuttle
Adam West
Peter Whitney
Robert J. Wilke
Marie Windsor
Donald Woods
Carleton G. Young
Tony Young

Episodes

References

External links
 Bourbon Street Beat at Thrilling Detectives website
 Bourbon Street Beat at the Internet Movie Database

1950s American drama television series
1960s American drama television series
1959 American television series debuts
1960 American television series endings
American Broadcasting Company original programming
Television series by Warner Bros. Television Studios
Television shows set in New Orleans
Black-and-white American television shows
American detective television series